Gabriel Badea-Päun (born 20 January 1973), is a French art historian of Romanian descent.

Having trained at the University of Bucharest, in the History Department, he pursued his studies at the Sorbonne (Paris IV) where he wrote his PhD thesis on Antonio de La Gandara (1861–1917), .
Gabriel Badea-Päun contributed to various art historical publications such as : Bulletin de la Société de l'Histoire de l'Art Français, Revue de la Bibliothèque Nationale de France, Nouvelles de l'Estampe, and Revue roumaine de l'histoire de l'art.

Bibliography

Books
Les Peintres roumains et la France (1834-1939)", Paris, In Fine Éditions d'art, 2019, (foreword by Adrian-Silvan Ionescu).
Pictori români în Franța (1834-1939)", (Romanian painters in France, 1834-1939), Bucharest, Noi Media Print, 2012..Le style Second Empire. Architecture, décors et art de vivre, Paris, Citadelles et Mazenod, 2009. (Foreword by Daniel Alcouffe), Prix Second Empire de la Fondation Napoléon 2010.Mecena si comanditari. Arta si mesaj politic, (Mecenas and commissioners. Art and political message), Bucharest, Noi Media Print, 2009.  (in Roumanian), Prize Alexandru Tzigara-Samurcaş of the Magazin Istoric Foundation, 2010.Portraits de Société XIXe – XXe siècle, Paris, Citadelles et Mazenod, 2007. Foreword by Richard Ormond. Prix du cercle Montherlant-Académie des Beaux-Arts 2008.The Society Portrait from David to Warhol, translated into English by Barbara Mellor, New York, Vendôme Press, 2007.The Society Portrait; Painting, Prestige And The Pursuit Of Elegance, translated into English by Barbara Mellor, London, Thames & Hudson, 2007. Carmen Sylva, la reine Elisabeth de Roumanie, Versailles, Via Romana, 2011, Carmen Sylva, uimitoarea Regina Elisabeta a României, translated from the French by Irina Margareta Nistor, Bucharest, Humanitas, 2003. New revised and enlarged edition in 2007.; third edition 2008; fourth edition in 2010.
 Carmen Sylva. Königin Elisabeth von Rumänien - eine rheinische Prinzessin auf Rumäniens Thron, German translation by Silvia Irina Zimmermann, Stuttgart, Ibidem Verlag, 2011,  Monarhi europeni. Marile modele. 1848-1914, (The European Monarchs. The Great Models), Bucharest, Silex, 1997. (with Ion Bulei)

Forewords and editions Eugen Wolbe, Regele Ferdinand al României, (King Ferdinand of Roumania), foreword by Gabriel Badea-Päun, Humanitas, 2004, pp. 7–14. Carmen Sylva, Versuri alese, (Selected verses), edition, foreword and chronology by Gabriel Badea-Päun, Bucharest, Eminescu, 1998.

Awards and distinctions
 Prix Second Empire de la Fondation Napoléon, 2010
 Knight of the Royal Decoration of the Cross of the Royal House of Romania
 Medalia Regele Mihai I pentru Loialitate, (The Medal for Loyalty King Michael of Roumania), 2010
 Prize Alexandru Tzigara-Samurcaş'' of the Magazin Istoric Foundation, 2010
 Prix du Cercle Montherlant-Académie des Beaux-Arts (2008) 
 Chevalier de l'Ordre du Mérite Culturel roumain (2009) Knight of the Roumanian Cultural Order of Merit

References

  Antonio de La Gandara
  Richard Ormond

External links 
 A choice of art books: The Spectator, 2007

1973 births
French art historians
French people of Romanian descent
Living people
Romanian expatriates in France
French male non-fiction writers
Paris-Sorbonne University alumni